The tetrad formalism is an approach to general relativity that generalizes the choice of basis for the tangent bundle from a coordinate basis to the less restrictive choice of a local basis, i.e. a locally defined set of four linearly independent vector fields called a tetrad or vierbein. It is a special case of the more general idea of a vielbein formalism, which is set in (pseudo-)Riemannian geometry. This article as currently written makes frequent mention of general relativity; however, almost everything it says is equally applicable to (pseudo-)Riemannian manifolds in general, and even to spin manifolds. In German, "vier" translates to "four", and "viel" to "many".

The general idea is to write the metric tensor as the product of two vielbeins, one on the left, and one on the right. The effect of the vielbeins is to change the coordinate system used on the tangent manifold to one that is simpler or more suitable for calculations. It is frequently the case that the vielbein coordinate system is orthonormal, as that is generally the easiest to use. Most tensors become simple or even trivial in this coordinate system; thus the complexity of most expressions is revealed to be an artifact of the choice of coordinates, rather than a innate property or physical effect.  That is, as a formalism, it does not alter predictions; it is rather a calculational technique.

The advantage of the tetrad formalism over the standard coordinate-based approach to general relativity lies in the ability to choose the tetrad basis to reflect important physical aspects of the spacetime. The abstract index notation denotes tensors as if they were represented by their coefficients with respect to a fixed local tetrad. Compared to a completely coordinate free notation, which is often conceptually clearer, it allows an easy and computationally explicit way to denote contractions.

The significance of the tetradic formalism appear in the Einstein–Cartan formulation of general relativity. The tetradic formalism of the theory is more fundamental than its metric formulation as one can not convert between the tetradic and metric formulations of the fermionic actions despite this being possible for bosonic actions. This is effectively because Weyl spinors can be very naturally defined on a Riemannian manifold and their natural setting leads to the spin connection. Those spinors take form in the vielbein coordinate system, and not in the manifold coordinate system.

The privileged tetradic formalism also appears in the deconstruction of higher dimensional Kaluza–Klein gravity theories and massive gravity theories, in which the extra-dimension(s) is/are replaced by series of N lattice sites such that the higher dimensional metric is replaced by a set of interacting metrics that depend only on the 4D components. Vielbeins commonly appear in other general settings in physics and mathematics. Vielbeins can be understood as solder forms.

Mathematical formulation

In the tetrad formalism, a tetrad basis is chosen: a set of  independent vector fields 
 
for  that together span the -dimensional tangent bundle at each point in the spacetime manifold . Dually, a vielbein (or tetrad in 4 dimensions) determines (and is determined by) a dual co-vielbein (co-tetrad) — a set of  independent 1-forms.

such that 

where  is the Kronecker delta. A vielbein is usually specified by its coefficients  with respect to a coordinate basis, despite the choice of a set of (local) coordinates  being unnecessary for the specification of a tetrad. Each covector is a solder form.

All tensors of the theory can be expressed in the vector and covector basis, by expressing them as linear combinations of members of the (co)vielbein. For example, the spacetime metric tensor can be transformed from a coordinate basis to the tetrad basis.

Popular tetrad bases in general relativity include orthonormal tetrads and null tetrads. Null tetrads are composed of four null vectors, so are used frequently in problems dealing with radiation, and are the basis of the Newman–Penrose formalism and the GHP formalism.

Relation to standard formalism
The standard formalism of differential geometry (and general relativity) consists simply of using the coordinate tetrad in the tetrad formalism. The coordinate tetrad is the canonical set of vectors associated with the coordinate chart. The coordinate tetrad is commonly denoted  whereas the dual cotetrad is denoted . These tangent vectors are usually defined as directional derivative operators: given a chart  which maps a subset of the manifold into coordinate space , and any scalar field , the coordinate vectors are such that:

The involvement of the coordinate tetrad is not usually made explicit in the standard formalism. In the tetrad formalism, instead of writing tensor equations out fully (including tetrad elements and tensor products  as above) only components of the tensors are mentioned. For example, the metric is written as "". When the tetrad is unspecified this becomes a matter of specifying the type of the tensor called abstract index notation. It allows to easily specify contraction between tensors by repeating indices as in the Einstein summation convention.

Changing tetrads is a routine operation in the standard formalism, as it is involved in every coordinate transformation (i.e., changing from one coordinate tetrad basis to another). Switching between multiple coordinate charts is necessary because, except in trivial cases, it is not possible for a single coordinate chart to cover the entire manifold. Changing to and between general tetrads is much similar and equally necessary (except for parallelizable manifolds). Any tensor can locally be written in terms of this coordinate tetrad or a general (co)tetrad.

For example, the metric tensor  can be expressed as:

(Here we use the Einstein summation convention). Likewise, the metric can be expressed with respect to an arbitrary (co)tetrad as

Here, we use choice of alphabet (Latin and Greek) for the index variables to distinguish the applicable basis.

We can translate from a general co-tetrad to the coordinate co-tetrad by expanding the covector . We then get 
 

from which it follows that . Likewise expanding  with respect to the general tetrad, we get

which shows that .

Manipulation of indices
The manipulation with tetrad coefficients shows that abstract index formulas can, in principle, be obtained from tensor formulas with respect to a coordinate tetrad by "replacing greek by latin indices". However care must be taken that a coordinate tetrad formula defines a genuine tensor when differentiation is involved. Since the coordinate vector fields have vanishing Lie bracket, naive substitutions of formulas that correctly compute tensor coefficients with respect to a coordinate tetrad may not correctly define a tensor with respect to a general tetrad because the Lie bracket is non-vanishing: . Thus, it is sometimes said that tetrad coordinates provide a non-holonomic basis.

For example, the Riemann curvature tensor is defined for general vector fields  by
.

In a coordinate tetrad this gives tensor coefficients

The naive "Greek to Latin" substitution of the latter expression

is incorrect because for fixed c and d,  is, in general, a first order differential operator rather than a zeroth order operator which defines a tensor coefficient.  Substituting a general tetrad basis in the abstract formula we find the proper definition of the curvature in abstract index notation, however: 

where . Note that the expression  is indeed a zeroth order operator, hence (the (c d)-component of) a tensor. Since it agrees with the coordinate expression for the curvature when specialised to a coordinate tetrad it is clear, even without using the abstract definition of the curvature, that it defines the same tensor as the coordinate basis expression.

Example: Lie groups
Given a vector (or covector) in the tangent (or cotangent) manifold, the exponential map describes the corresponding geodesic of that tangent vector.  Writing , the parallel transport of a differential corresponds to

The above can be readily verified simply by taking  to be a matrix.

For the special case of a Lie algebra, the  can be taken to be an element of the algebra, the exponential is the exponential map of a Lie group, and group elements correspond to the geodesics of the tangent vector.  Choosing a basis  for the Lie algebra and writing  for some functions  the commutators can be explicitly written out. One readily computes that

for  the structure constants of the Lie algebra.  The series can be written more compactly as 

with the infinite series 

The matrix  is then the vielbein; it expresses the differential  in terms of the "flat coordinates" (orthonormal, at that) .

Given some map  from some manifold  to some Lie group , the metric tensor on the manifold  becomes the pullback of the metric tensor  on the Lie group : 

The metric tensor  on the Lie group is the Cartan metric, aka the Killing form. Note that, as a matrix, the second W is the transpose. The above generalizes to the case of symmetric spaces. These vielbeins are used to perform calculations in sigma models, of which the supergravity theories are a special case.

See also
 Frame bundle
 Orthonormal frame bundle
 Principal bundle
 Spin bundle
 Connection (mathematics)
 G-structure
 Spin manifold
 Spin structure
 Dirac equation in curved spacetime

Notes

Citations

References

External links
 General Relativity with Tetrads

Differential geometry
Theory of relativity
Mathematical notation